Dinogamasus is a genus of mites in the family Laelapidae. Most species are associated with carpenter bees in the genus Xylocopa and are found in their acarinarium.

Species
 Dinogamasus acutus LeVeque, 1930
 Dinogamasus affinis (Berlese, 1918)
 Dinogamasus albulus Lundqvist, 1998
 Dinogamasus alfkeni (Oudemans, 1902)
 Dinogamasus amaniensis (Vitzthum, 1919)
 Dinogamasus assimiensis Lundqvist, 1998
 Dinogamasus bakeri LeVeque, 1931
 Dinogamasus bequaerti LeVeque, 1930
 Dinogamasus braunsi (Vitzthum, 1914)
 Dinogamasus brevihirtus LeVeque, 1930
 Dinogamasus brevipes LeVeque, 1931
 Dinogamasus collarti (Oudemans, 1929)
 Dinogamasus concinnus LeVeque, 1931
 Dinogamasus crassipes Kramer, 1898
 Dinogamasus heteraspis LeVeque, 1930
 Dinogamasus inflatus LeVeque, 1930
 Dinogamasus jacobsoni (Berlese, 1910)
 Dinogamasus kerrianus LeVeque, 1931
 Dinogamasus kordofaniensis Lundqvist, 1998
 Dinogamasus levequae Lundqvist, 1998
 Dinogamasus macgregori LeVeque, 1931
 Dinogamasus maxima (Vitzthum, 1919)
 Dinogamasus medini Cunliffe, 1959
 Dinogamasus minor Lundqvist, 1998
 Dinogamasus northolmensis Loots, 1980
 Dinogamasus occidentalis Lundqvist, 1998
 Dinogamasus octoconus LeVeque, 1931
 Dinogamasus oudemansi LeVeque, 1930
 Dinogamasus parvus LeVeque, 1930
 Dinogamasus perkinsi (Oudemans, 1901)
 Dinogamasus philippinensis LeVeque, 1930
 Dinogamasus piperi LeVeque, 1930
 Dinogamasus productus LeVeque, 1930
 Dinogamasus ramaleyi LeVeque, 1931
 Dinogamasus schoutedeni (Oudemans, 1929)
 Dinogamasus similis LeVeque, 1931
 Dinogamasus sjoestedti (Trägårdh, 1904)
 Dinogamasus sternisetosa (Vitzthum, 1930)
 Dinogamasus tonkinensis Lundqvist, 1998
 Dinogamasus tortivus Lundqvist, 1998
 Dinogamasus trihirtus LeVeque, 1931
 Dinogamasus villosior (Berlese, 1918)
 Dinogamasus vitzthumi (Oudemans, 1926)

References

Laelapidae
Parasites of bees